Tsukamurella hongkongensis is a Gram-positive, aerobic, non-spore-forming and non-motile bacterium from the genus of Tsukamurella. It has been isolated from a human clinical sample in the Queen Mary Hospital in Hong Kong.

References

External links
Type strain of Tsukamurella hongkongensis at BacDive -  the Bacterial Diversity Metadatabase	

Mycobacteriales
Bacteria described in 2016